The Miss Hollywood competition is an official preliminary pageant to Miss California and Miss America.
The pageant has been held annually since 1997.  In 13 years, two titleholders have won Miss California and all titleholders have earned a total of $123,575 in scholarships at the local, state and national level.

Winners 
The following titleholders represented Hollywood at the Miss California pageant.

References

Hollywood
1997 establishments in California
American awards
Local Beauty pageants
History of women in California